Soloe sexmaculata is a moth in the family Erebidae. It is found in western Africa.

External links
 Species info

Aganainae
Moths described in 1880